Derrick Crass (born August 6, 1960) was an Olympic weightlifter for the United States.  In his early years he lifted under Coach and Mentor Ted Frank at the Belleville Weightlifting Club (IL) who laid the foundation for all future lifting achievements. In his early twenties he was selected to train at the Colorado Springs Training Facility and from then on was coached by Harvey Newton and Jim Schmitz. In 1996, he had the honor of gracing the cover of a CD, entitled Amazing Disgrace, by the rock band The Posies. The image was taken from the 1984 Olympic Games in Los Angeles, CA, USA.

Weightlifting achievements 
 Olympic team member (1984 and 1988)
 [Pan Am Games] team member (1987)
 Senior World Championship team member (1982 and 1989)
 Junior World Championships team member (1980)
 Gold Medalist in Oceania Championships (1984)
 Bronze Medalist in Pannonia Cup (1982)
 Silver Medalist in Manuel Suarez Cup (1987)
 Bronze Medalist in Moomba Cup (1990)
 Senior National Champion (1987, 1989, and 1990)
 Best Lifter at Senior National Championships (1989)

Notes of interest 
With his daughter, Rachel, they became the second father and daughter to compete together at a USA Senior National Championship (2002). To date, they are the only known father and daughter pair in the world to compete at the Junior World Championships and Senior World Championships. In 2010 Derrick Crass invented DC Blocks; stackable and portable weightlifting blocks made in the USA from 100% recycled plastic. Derrick currently resides in Ormond Beach, Florida. 

In 2013 Derrick graduated from Saint Louis University as a Physician Assistant, but has retired. He has an internet business to sell and promote his invention: DC Blocks. DC Blocks products are an extremely versatile, lightweight, stackable, interlocking, and virtually indestructible system to raise the barbell from the floor to perform various weightlifting exercises, as well as being an integral piece of equipment while performing other exercises. www.dcblocksusa.com

External links 
 Derrick Crass the Official Site

1960 births
Living people
American male weightlifters
Olympic weightlifters of the United States
Weightlifters at the 1984 Summer Olympics
Weightlifters at the 1988 Summer Olympics
20th-century American people
21st-century American people